Sabine Bethmann (25 October 1929 – 8 November 2021) was a German film and television actress.

Biography
Bethmann was born in Tilsit, East Prussia on 25 October 1929. She first appeared in the 1956 movie Waldwinter and became popular by her Fritz Lang movies like The Tiger of Eschnapur and The Indian Tomb. Bethmann abandoned her career in 1968 and appeared only in a few TV productions afterwards.

She was originally cast for the role of Varinia in Spartacus but only lasted two days. During that time, Anthony Mann resigned as director after a falling-out with Kirk Douglas and was succeeded by Stanley Kubrick who demanded a more experienced actress for the role. Bethmann was replaced by Jean Simmons.

Bethmann died on 8 November 2021, at the age of 92.

Filmography

1956: Waldwinter
1956: Das Donkosakenlied
1956: My Aunt, Your Aunt
1957: Das große Heimweh / Heimweh – dort, wo die Blumen blüh'n
1957: 
1958: The Csardas King
1958: Vergiß mein nicht / Ohne Dich kann ich nicht leben
1959: The Tiger of Eschnapur
1959: The Indian Tomb
1959: Heimat – Deine Lieder
1959: 
1960: Juanito
1962: Doctor Sibelius
1962: Alarm für Dora X (TV)
1962: Trompeten der Liebe / Der Pastor mit der Jazztrompete
1963: 
1963: Scotland Yard Hunts Dr. Mabuse
1964: Schwarzer Peter (TV)
1965: Intercontinental-Express (TV)
1965: Jean (TV)
1965: Mädchen hinter Gittern
1965: Oklahoma John
1966: Cliff Dexter (TV)
1966: The Doctor Speaks Out
1968: Erotik auf der Schulbank
1968: Die Lümmel von der ersten Bank – Zum Teufel mit der Penne
1968: 
1970: Gentlemen in White Vests
1979: The Old Fox: Teufelsbrut (TV)
1990: Kaffeklatsch (short)

References

External links
 
  
 Biography of Sabine Bethmann(German)

1929 births
2021 deaths
20th-century German actresses
German film actresses
German television actresses
People from East Prussia
People from Tilsit